Ohio's 21st senatorial district has historically been based in urban Cleveland, Ohio, and consists primarily of Cleveland's West Side neighborhoods of Ohio City and Tremont; Downtown Cleveland; all of Cleveland's East Side neighborhoods; and the cities of Bratenahl, Cleveland Heights, and Shaker Heights. It encompasses Ohio House districts 9, 10 and 11. It has a Cook PVI of D+33.

Its current Ohio Senator is Democrat Dale Martin of Cleveland. Martin was appointed on June 7, 2022, by a caucus of State Senate Democrats after the incumbent senator, Sandra Williams, resigned on June 1.

List of senators

References

External links
Ohio's 21st district senator at the 133rd Ohio General Assembly official website

Ohio State Senate districts